The Battle of Isaszeg was fought between King Béla IV of Hungary and his son, Stephen, who served as Junior King and Duke of Transylvania. Stephen defeated his father's army in the subsequent peace Béla was obliged to cede the government of the Eastern parts of his kingdom again to his son.

On 23 March 1266, father and son confirmed the peace in the Convent of the Blessed Virgin on the Nyulak szigete ('Rabbits' Island').

Sources
Kristó, Gyula: Családja eredete, Csák Máté (Magyar história). Gondolat, 1983, Budapest. 
Zsoldos, Attila: Családi ügy - IV. Béla és István ifjabb király viszálya az 1260-as években (A Family Affair - The Conflict of Béla IV and Junior King Stephen in the 1260s); História - MTA Történettudományi Intézete, 2007, Budapest; .

Conflicts in 1265
1265 in Europe
Isaszeg
Isaszeg 1265
Military history of Hungary
13th century in Hungary
History of Pest County